The Chicago, Milwaukee and St. Paul Railroad Depot is a former Chicago, Milwaukee and St. Paul Railroad (the Milwaukee Road) depot in Montevideo, Minnesota, United States.  It is now listed on the National Register of Historic Places. The station was built in 1901 and is the only remaining building in Montevideo that was built by the railroad. The Milwaukee Road ceased passenger service to Montevideo in 1969.

The depot is now the Milwaukee Road Heritage Center, a railroad museum that focuses on interpreting the history of the Milwaukee Road as it influenced Montevideo in the late 19th century through the 1980s.  The Milwaukee Road Heritage Center also displays donated railroad equipment, such as a 200-ton crane, passenger and baggage cars, freight cars, a Plymouth Locomotive Works 44-ton switching locomotive, and a  diesel switcher built by Electro-Motive Division in 1939.  The group has also restored a turntable that provides access to a 26-stall roundhouse.

References

External links
 Milwaukee Road Heritage Center
 MRHC photos

See also 

 List of United States railroads
 List of Minnesota railroads
 List of heritage railroads in the United States
 List of railway museums

Museums in Chippewa County, Minnesota
Railroad museums in Minnesota
Railway stations on the National Register of Historic Places in Minnesota
Montevideo, Minnesota
Former railway stations in Minnesota
National Register of Historic Places in Chippewa County, Minnesota
Railway stations in the United States opened in 1901
Railway stations closed in 1969
Transportation in Chippewa County, Minnesota
Montevideo, Minnesota